The Korea Basketball Association (KBA) is the governing body of basketball in South Korea. Formed in 1925, it is based in Seoul. The KBA is a member of the International Basketball Federation (FIBA) and FIBA Asia. The current president of the federation is Pang Yul.

The federation also organizes the South Korea national basketball team and the South Korea women's national basketball team.

Tournaments 
 Korean Basketball League
 Women's Korean Basketball League

Logo

References

External links 
 KBA official site
 KBL official site
 WKBL official site

Basketball in South Korea
Basketball
Basketball governing bodies in Asia
Sports organizations established in 1925